Ben Buckler is an urban locality in the eastern suburbs of Sydney, in the state of New South Wales, Australia. It is part of the suburb of North Bondi in the Waverley Council local government area. It is sometimes referred to simply as "the northern headland of Bondi Bay."

Ben Buckler is the location of the heritage-listed Ben Buckler Gun Battery, which was built in 1892 and subsequently buried; it was later excavated by the NSW Water Board and then reburied. It is also the location of the heritage-listed Bondi Sewer Vent.

Etymology 
The first recorded use of the name was in 1831, when a land grant to Richard Hurd at North Bondi was described as being "...to a point called Ben Buckler." Common theories about its name were set out in a research note issued by Waverley Council Library:  
 It is named after a convict, Benjamin Buckler or Ben Buckley, who lived locally with the Aboriginal people in 1810;
 A bushranger named Ben Buckley lived in a cave in the rocks at the northern end of Bondi Beach;
 Obed West (1807–1891) claimed that it was a corruption of an Aboriginal word.

Gallery

References

Sydney localities
Waverley Council